The Multnomah Hotel, located in downtown Portland, Oregon, United States, is a historic hotel building listed on the National Register of Historic Places. It currently operates as the Embassy Suites by Hilton Portland Downtown.

History

The 700-room hotel was built by local entrepreneur Philip Gevurtz and opened on February 8, 1912. The nine-story building filled an entire city block. It was operated by Western Hotels, now known as Westin Hotels & Resorts, from 1931 until it closed in 1963. At the time of its closure, The Oregonian wrote that the Multnomah had been "one of the most famous hotels on the Pacific Coast". From 1965 to 1992 the building housed government offices. It was sold in 1995 and restored, its 700 rooms reduced to 276 suites, reopening in 1997 as the Embassy Suites Portland - Downtown. The hotel is currently a member of Historic Hotels of America, the official program of the National Trust for Historic Preservation.

Famous guests
The hotel has hosted Queen Marie of Romania, Charles Lindbergh, Rudolph Valentino, Amelia Earhart, Jimmy Stewart, Bing Crosby, Jack Benny, Elvis Presley, and every president from Theodore Roosevelt to Richard Nixon.Maurice Ravel and Lisa Roma concert in Ball Room Feb.15, 1928 8:30 pm

See also
 National Register of Historic Places listings in Southwest Portland, Oregon

References

External links

Embassy Suites by Hilton Portland Downtown (official website)
Multnomah Hotel history from pdxhistory.com
Images of the Multnomah Hotel from the University of Oregon digital archives

1912 establishments in Oregon
Hotel buildings completed in 1912
Hotel buildings on the National Register of Historic Places in Portland, Oregon
Portland Historic Landmarks
Renaissance Revival architecture in Oregon
Skyscraper hotels in Portland, Oregon
Southwest Portland, Oregon
Historic Hotels of America